All These Creatures is an Australian live-action short film written and directed by Charles Williams. It was awarded the Short Film Palme d'Or at the 2018 Cannes Film Festival.

The film was shot in Dandenong in Victoria, Australia on 16mm film.

Plot
An adolescent boy attempts to untangle his memories of a mysterious infestation, the unraveling of his father, and the little creatures inside us all.

Cast
Yared Scott as Tempest
Mandela Mathia as Mal

Reception
The film was awarded the Short Film Palme d'Or at the 2018 Cannes Film Festival. It later went on to make its North American Premiere at the 2018 Toronto International Film Festival. and win more than 50 other international awards including Australian Academy of Cinema and Television Arts Best Short Film.

Catherine Bray at Sight & Sound reviewed the film as one of the best of Cannes, stating that "What sets Williams’s piece apart is a sense of wonder in the smallest details". Vulture Hound gave All These Creatures five stars out of five describing it as "utterly beautiful"  and Nouse described it as "One of the most important short films of the year"

References

External links
 
 

2018 films
Short Film Palme d'Or winners
2018 drama films
2018 short films
Films set in 2018
Australian drama short films